William James Orton Henderson MBE (13 October 1916 – 15 May 2006) was a Liberal party member of the House of Commons of Canada. He was born in Empress, Alberta and became a soldier, barrister, lawyer and Supreme Court of Ontario judge.

He studied at Queen's University and graduated with a Bachelor of Arts degree in 1938. In 1942, he was formally installed as a lawyer after graduating from Osgoode Hall Law School. During this time, he also served in the Canadian Forces from 1939, including some service in World War II, joining the Royal Canadian Corps of Signals in 1942 before his discharge in 1946. He remained a reservist until 1952. He was made a Member of the Order of the British Empire (MBE) for his work in re-establishing a functioning judicial system in the Netherlands following World War II.

Henderson was first elected at the Kingston City riding in the 1949 general election. After a redistribution of electoral districts, Henderson was re-elected for successive Parliamentary terms in at the Kingston riding in the 1953 and 1957 elections. He was defeated in the 1958 election by Benjamin Allmark of the Progressive Conservative party.

In 1965, he was appointed a judge of the Supreme Court of Ontario. He is also considered a founder of Amherstview, a suburban community near Kingston. The local recreation centre in Amherstview is dedicated in his name. He was also named to the Kingston and District Sports Hall of Fame in 2005.

Henderson died at Kingston General Hospital on 15 May 2006, aged 89.

References

External links
 

1916 births
2006 deaths
Canadian military personnel of World War II
Members of the House of Commons of Canada from Ontario
Members of the United Church of Canada
Liberal Party of Canada MPs
Lawyers in Ontario
Judges in Ontario
People from Special Areas, Alberta
Canadian Officers of the Order of the British Empire